The Hipódromo de San Isidro is a horse racing track located in San Isidro, Buenos Aires, Argentina, owned by the Argentine Jockey Club. It is one of the largest and most important racetracks in the Americas. 120 racing days are held per year, on every Wednesday, every other Friday and Saturday, and some Sundays.

The Hipódromo is located 22 km from Buenos Aires City. It has an area of 1.48 km2. 

Each December, the Hipódromo hosts the Gran Premio Carlos Pellegrini, the most important horse race in Argentina.

The Hipódromo de San Isidro hosts the annual Carlos Pellegrini Awards.

History 
In 1926, the Argentine Jockey Club purchased 316 hectares for the purposes of building an additional racecourse to accompany its Hipódromo de Palermo. In 1930, a golf course was completed on the property, designed by Allister Mckenzie. The course itself was built using the latest methods, with accompanying training tracks, stalls, and veterinary hospital building. On December 8, 1935, the racecourse was completed and opened.

An inner dirt track was added in 1994.

Facilities 

The record attendance is 300,000 for the 2022 LollaPalooza Argentina.

There are 135 stables containing 1,800 stalls.

Other amenities include a chemical laboratory that processes post-race samples from across the country, a veterinary hospital with a Center for Regenerative Veterinary Medicine, a school for apprentice jockeys, a school for farriers, an arboretum, and a sales floor for horses containing space for 3,600 people.

Important Races 
Group 1 Races

 Copa de Oro Alfredo Lalor
 Copa de Plata Roberto Vasquez Mansilla Internacional
 Dos Mil Guineas
 Gran Criterium
 Gran Premio 25 de Mayo - Copa Dr. Enrique Olivera
 Gran Premio Carlos Pellegrini Internacional
 Gran Premio de Potrancas
 Gran Premio Enrique Acebal
 Gran Premio Felix de Alzaga Unzué Internacional
 Gran Premio Hipódromo de San Isidro - Copa Melchor Ángel Posse
 Gran Premio Joaquin S. de Anchorena Internacional
 Gran Premio Jockey Club
 Gran Premio Miguel Alfredo Martínez de Hoz
 Gran Premio Suipacha
 Mil Guineas

Group 2 Races

 Gran Premio 9 de Julio
 Gran Premio América
 Gran Premio Carlos P. Rodriguez
 Gran Premio Cyllene
 Gran Premio Ecuador
 Gran Premio Eliseo Ramírez
 Gran Premio Federico de Alvear
 Gran Premio Forli
 Gran Premio Horacio Bustillo
 Gran Premio Juan Shaw
 Gran Premio La Mission
 Gran Premio Los Haras
 Gran Premio Omega
 Gran Premio Partícula
 Gran Premio Paseana
 Gran Premio Pippermint
 Gran Premio Raúl y Raúl E. Chevallier
 Gran Premio Ricardo Ezequiel y Ezequiel M. Fernández Guerrico
 Gran Premio Sibila

Group 3 Races

 Gran Premio Botafogo
 Gran Premio Condesa
 Gran Premio de la Provincia de Buenos Aires César Iraola
 Gran Premio Ensayo Fernando Santamarina
 Gran Premio Eudoro J. Balsa
 Gran Premio General Las Heras
 Gran Premio General Pueyrredón
 Gran Premio General Viamonte
 Gran Premio Invasor
 Gran Premio Ocurrencia
 Gran Premio Olavarría
 Gran Premio Pedro Chapar
 Gran Premio Porteño
 Gran Premio Progreso
 Gran Premio Santiago Lawrie
 Gran Premio Southern Halo
 Gran Premio Velocidad

References

External links
 Institutional website
 Racecourse Profile on Horse Racing South America

Horse racing venues in Argentina
San Isidro, Buenos Aires
Sports venues in Argentina